Uğur Çiftçi (born 4 May 1992) is a Turkish professional footballer who plays as a left-back for Sivasspor in the Süper Lig.

Honours
Sivasspor
 Turkish Cup: 2021–22

References

External links
 
 
 

1992 births
Living people
People from Sivas
Turkish footballers
Association football fullbacks
Turkey international footballers
Turkey under-21 international footballers
Süper Lig players
Gençlerbirliği S.K. footballers
Hacettepe S.K. footballers
Sivasspor footballers